Dickensonville is a small unincorporated community at the junction of U.S. Route 58 Alternate and State Route 71 in Russell County, Virginia. Located about midway between Lebanon and Saint Paul, Dickensonville was locally known as Old Court House, since it is the location of the Old Russell County Courthouse. This name also found its way into the 1918 law describing state highways in Virginia. The community served as the county seat from 1786 until 1818 when it moved to Lebanon.

References

Unincorporated communities in Russell County, Virginia
Former county seats in Virginia
Unincorporated communities in Virginia